St George the Martyr's Church, North and South Clifton is a Grade II* listed parish church in the Church of England in North Clifton, Nottinghamshire.

History

The church dates from the 13th century.

It is part of a group of parishes which includes 
St Bartholomew's Church, Langford
St Giles' Church, Holme
St Cecilia's Church, Girton
All Saints' Church, Harby
All Saints' Church, Collingham
St John the Baptist's Church, Collingham
St Helena's Church, South Scarle
Holy Trinity Church, Besthorpe
St Helen's Church, Thorney
All Saints' Church, Winthorpe

References

Church of England church buildings in Nottinghamshire
Grade II* listed churches in Nottinghamshire
Newark and Sherwood